The Skies of Pern is a science fiction novel by the American-Irish author Anne McCaffrey. It was the sixteenth book published in the Dragonriders of Pern series by Anne or her son Todd McCaffrey.

The Skies of Pern was first published in 2001. It was the first Pern book using the same painting to illustrate the UK and US covers.

This novel follows soon after The Dolphins of Pern, and, in contrast to the previous several Pern novels, takes place in a very short period of time within the same year.

To ensure accuracy, Anne consulted with a number of astronomers who planned and modelled the comet impact and subsequent consequences, this group included author Bill Napier, Harry Alm and future YouTuber Scott Manley.

Plot
A rogue comet that strikes Pern leads the Weyrleaders and Holders, contemplating a future where dragonriders are not needed in a Threadless world, to consider the creation of a new Star Craft made of dragonriders. The discovery by dragonriders F'lessan and Tai, later brutally attacked by large felines, of the draconic use of telekinesis, only strengthens their resolve to keep Pern's skies free of danger.

At the same time, disgruntled citizens resisting the ever-growing role of technology in Pernese life band together as Abominators, attacking Crafthalls, and are determined to destroy all the new technology in use. These fanatics are seemingly allied with Toric, the Southern Lord Holder.

Notes

References

External links

2001 novels
2001 science fiction novels
Dragonriders of Pern books
Novels by Anne McCaffrey
Del Rey books